Silence compression provides a way to squeeze redundancy out of sound files. The silence compression scheme is essential for efficient voice communication systems. It allows significant reduction of transmission bandwidth during a period of silence.

A silence compression scheme include a voice activity detection (VAD), a silence insertion descriptor (SID) and a comfort noise generator (CNG) module.

Parameters used for silence compression
Threshold value
The way to encode silence
Threshold for recognizing start of silence
An indication of when silence is over
A parameter to get a threshold, which means that there is no silence until or unless there is three silence in the rows.

Data compression